Jim O'Meara (born 1966) is an Irish retired Gaelic footballer who played as a centre-forward for the Tipperary senior team.

Born in Grangemockler, County Tipperary, O'Meara first arrived on the inter-county scene at the age of sixteen when he first linked up with the Tipperary minor team before later joining the under-21 side. O'Meara joined the senior panel during the 1986 championship.

At club level O'Meara played with Grangemockler.

He retired from inter-county football following the conclusion of the 1995 championship.

In retirement from playing O'Meara became involved in team management and coaching, most notably as manager of the Tipperary junior team.

Honours

Player
Tipperary
Munster Minor Football Championship (1): 1984

References

1966 births
Living people
Gaelic football managers
Grangemockler Gaelic footballers
Tipperary inter-county Gaelic footballers